Anguilla requires its residents to register their motor vehicles and display vehicle registration plates. Current plates, changed in 2007, have a blue and white background with black letters and are North American standard 6 × 12 inches (152 × 300 mm). Vehicle plates have an 'A' followed by four digits.  
The letter denoting the type of vehicle has been moved to the front and 'P' is now designated for personal vehicles.

See also 
 Vehicle registration plates of British overseas territories

References

Anguilla
Transport in Anguilla
Anguilla-related lists